Coluthur Gopalan FRCP, FRS, FAMS, FASc (29 November 1918 – 3 October 2019) was an Indian nutritionist. He was responsible for initiating nutrition research in independent India, leading to a number of interventions such as the Integrated Child Development Services, the midday meal scheme for school children, goiter prevention programme, etc. The burning feet syndrome is also known as Grierson-Gopalan syndrome. While the condition was described in 1826 by a British medical officer James Grierson, Gopalan also described this condition in 1946 when he observed it, "chiefly in females between the ages of 20 and 40 years, among the poor in South India".

Early life and education 
He was born in Salem, Madras Presidency, British India.His father was a Police officer.At the age of ten he moved from Salem to Madras and joined  Madras Christian College Higher Secondary School and  later he joined the Madras Medical College and earned an M.D. from University of Madras, and Ph.D. and D.Sc. from University of London. Starting his professional career in nutrition research at the Nutrition Research Laboratory during the British period, he continued there for the next six decades. In the late 1950s, when the Nutrition Research Laboratory moved to Hyderabad and turned to the National Institute of Nutrition, Gopalan took over as director and expanded research to several key areas.

Career 
Gopalan's research led to a midday meal scheme for school children and a goiter prevention programme. He founded the National Nutrition Foundation, which published Nutritive Value of Indian Foods. He was a recipient of the civilian honours of the Padma Shri and the Padma Bhushan. He set up divisions for clinical research, biochemistry, bio-physics, endocrinology, analytical chemistry, food toxicology and the field units in multi-disciplinary subjects.

National Nutrition Monitoring Bureau which is  product of his effort  started the research to tackle problems such as protein energy malnutrition, Vitamin A deficiency, Phrynoderma, Lathyrism, fluorosis and Pellagra.

He was the director of the Indian Council of Medical Research there he expanded research into neglected communicable diseases and modernised the working of the council. Three new institutes — Malaria Research Institute; Vector Control Research Institute and Leprosy Research Institute were established to develop and implement preventive and management strategies for these diseases.

Gopalan's works on  Indian foods also are commendable. he  analysed  over 500 Indian foods for their Nutritive Values and published a detailed study report of that. This work was used for calculating dietary in-take of all nutrients. This made India the first developing country to have its own recommended dietary allowances.

“NIN today bears testimony to his genius as an architect and father of nutrition sciences in India. Research under his leadership formed the basis of major national nutrition programmes initiated in the 1970s such as ICDS [Integrated Child Development Services] and Massive Dose Vitamin-A and iron supplementation,” said R Hemalatha, director, National Institute of Nutrition.

“Gopalan was a visionary institution builder. He viewed medical and nutrition science from a holistic perspective and always wanted to address them taking a multi-disciplinary and multi-sectoral approach. His contributions to medical science in general and nutrition science in particular are immense. He, in fact, brought nutrition to centre stage and was instrumental in putting it as an important driver in developmental plans and policies of the country,” said Balram Bhargava, director-general of the Indian Council of Medical Research. (India Science Wire)

References

External links
Coluthur Gopalan, neglectedscience.com

Indian centenarians
1918 births
2019 deaths
Indian nutritionists
Fellows of the Royal Society
Fellows of the Royal College of Physicians
Men centenarians
People from Salem, Tamil Nadu
Recipients of the Padma Bhushan in medicine
Recipients of the Padma Shri in medicine
Scientists from Tamil Nadu
20th-century Indian biologists